Banshidhar Bhagat is an Indian politician and member of the Bharatiya Janata Party. Bhagat is a member of the Uttarakhand Legislative Assembly from the Kaladhungi (Uttarakhand Assembly constituency) in Nainital district. Previously, he was the state president of BJP Uttarakhand unit. Currently, he is the Cabinet Minister of Uttarakhand government.

References 

People from Nainital district
Bharatiya Janata Party politicians from Uttarakhand
Uttarakhand MLAs 2022–2027
Living people
Uttarakhand MLAs 2017–2022
Year of birth missing (living people)
State Presidents of Bharatiya Janata Party